Han Hwak (Hangul: 한확, Hanja: 韓確); 1400  1456), nicknamed Ganyijae (간이재), was a politician and a diplomat during the Joseon period of Korea. He served as Left State Councillor. Han Hwak is mostly known by his second daughter, the Queen Insu. She married the son of Prince Suyang (who was a son of King Sejong). Some years later, Suyang became King Sejo, the seventh King of the Joseon Dynasty, and his son became Crown Prince Uigyeong. The honorary title Queen Insu was granted when one of the children of Insu and Uigyeong became the King Seongjong of Joseon. His eldest daughter Princess Consort Jeongseon, was the wife of Prince Gyeyang (a son of Sejong the Great by a concubine).

Family 
 Grandfather
 Han Nyeong (한녕, 韓寧)
 Father
 Han Yeong-jeong (한영정, 韓永矴)
 Mother
 Lady Kim of the Uiseong Kim clan (정경부인 의성 김씨) (? - 13 March 1423)
 Grandfather - Kim Yeong-ryeol (김영렬, 金英烈) (? - 1404)
 Siblings 
 Older sister - Consort Kanghuizhuangshuli of the Cheongju Han clan (康惠莊淑麗妃 清州韓氏) (d. 12 August 1424)
 Younger brother - Han Jeon (한전, 韓磌) (1408 - 1447)
 Nephew - Han Chung-in (한충인, 韓忠仁)
 Younger sister - Han Gye-ran (한계란, 韓桂蘭), Consort Gongshin (공신부인, 恭愼夫人) (1410 - 1438)
 Younger brother - Han Jil (한질)
 Sister-in-law - Lady Jo of the Yangju Jo clan (양주 조씨)
 Nephew - Han Chi-won (한치원, 韓致元)
 Nephew - Han Chi-hyeong (한치형, 韓致亨) (1434 - 30 October 1502)
 Niece-in-law - Princess Yi of the Jeonju Yi clan (현주 전주 이씨) (? - 17 July 1494); daughter of Grand Prince Yangnyeong 
 Grandniece - Lady Han of the Cheongju Han clan (청주 한씨)
 Grandnephew-in-law - Im Yu-chim (임유침, 林有琛)
 Great-Grandnephew - Im Se-chang (임세창, 林世昌)
 Great-Grandnephew - Im Se-bang (임세방, 林世芳)
 Great-Grandnephew - Im Se-bun (임세분, 林世賁)
 Niece-in-law - Lady Woo of the Danyang Woo clan (단양 우씨, 丹陽 禹氏); daughter of Woo Yeon-ji (우연지, 禹延之)
 Grandnephew - Han Sa-ja (한사자, 韓獅子)
 Nephew - Han Chi-ryang (한치량, 韓致良) (1436 - 1525)
 Nephew - Han Chi-mi (한치미, 韓致美)
 Wife 
 Internal Princess Consort Namyang of the Namyang Hong clan (남양부부인 홍씨, 南陽府夫人 洪氏) (1403 - 1450)
 Father-in-law - Hong Yeo-bang (홍여방, 洪汝方)
 Mother-in-law - Lady Jeong of the Dongrae Jeong clan (동래 정씨, 東來 鄭氏)
 Children
 Son - Han Chi-in (한치인, 韓致仁) (1421 - 1477) 
 Daughter-in-law - Lady Jo of the Baecheon Jo clan (배천 조씨, 白川 趙氏)
 Daughter - Princess Consort Jeongseon of the Cheongju Han clan (정선군부인 청주 한씨, 旌善郡夫人 淸州韓氏) (12 April 1426 - 27 April 1480)
 Son-in-law - Yi Jeung, Prince Gyeyang (계양군 이증, 桂陽君 李璔) (1427 - 16 August 1467)
 Grandson - Yi Ye, Prince Yeongwon (영원군 예, 寧原君 澧)
 Grandson - Yi Suk, Prince Kangyang (강양군 숙, 江陽君 潚)
 Grandson - Yi Sik, Prince Burim (부림군 식, 富林君 湜)
 Granddaughter - Princess Yi of the Jeonju Yi clan (향주 전주 이씨)
 Grandson-in-law - Ahn Gye-song (안계송, 安繼宋)
 Granddaughter - Princess Yi of the Jeonju Yi clan (향주 전주 이씨)
 Grandson-in-law - Jeong Gyeong-jo (정경조, 鄭敬祖) (1455 - July 1498)
 Granddaughter - Princess Yi of the Jeonju Yi clan (향주 전주 이씨)
 Grandson-in-law - Han Geum (한금, 韓嶔)
 Daughter - Lady Han of the Cheongju Han clan 
 Son-in-law - Yi Gye-nyeon (이계년)
 Daughter - Lady Han of the Cheongju Han clan 
 Son-in-law - Kim Ja-wan (김자완)
 Daughter - Lady Han of the Cheongju Han clan 
 Son-in-law - Choi Yeon (최연)
 Daughter - Lady Han of the Cheongju Han clan 
 Son-in-law - Gwon Jib (권집)
 Daughter - Queen Sohye of the Cheongju Han clan (소혜왕후 한씨, 昭惠王后 韓氏) (7 October 1437 - 11 May 1504)
 Son-in-law - King Deokjong of Joseon (덕종, 德宗) (3 October 1438 - 20 September 1457)
 Grandson - Yi Jeong, Grand Prince Wolsan (월산대군 정, 月山大君 婷) (5 January 1455 - 22 January 1489)
 Granddaughter - Yi Gyeong-geun, Princess Myeongsuk (경근 명숙공주, 慶根 明淑公主) (1455 - 1482)
 Grandson - Yi Hyeol, King Seongjong of Joseon (성종대왕, 成宗大王) (19 August 1457 - 19 January 1495)
 Son - Han Chi-ui (한치의, 韓致義) (1440 - 1473)
 Son - Han Chi-rye (한치례, 韓致禮) (1441 - 1499)
 Daughter-in-law - Lady Ahn of the Juksan Ahn clan (죽산 안씨, 竹山 安氏) (? - 1492)
 Grandson - Han Ik (한익, 韓翊) (1460 - 1488)
 Granddaughter-in-law - Lady Park of the Suncheon Park clan (정부인 순천 박씨)
 Great-Grandson - Han Se-chang (한세창, 韓世昌) 
 Great-Grandson - Han Suk-chang (한숙창, 韓叔昌) (1478 - 1537)
 Great-Great-Granddaughter-in-law - Lady Yi of the Jeonju Yi clan (전주 이씨)
 Great-Great-Granddaughter - Lady Han of the Cheongju Han clan (정부인 청주 한씨)
 Great-Great-Grandson-in-law - Heo Yeob (허엽, 許曄) (19 December 1517 - 4 February 1580)
 Great-Great-Grandson - Han Ja (한자, 韓慈)
 Great-Great-Great-Grandson - Han Gyeong-hui (한경희)
 Great-Great-Great-Grandson - Han Gyeong-woo (한경우, 韓景祐) (1522 - ?)
 - Great-Great-Great-Granddaughter-in-law - Yi Seon-hwan (이선환, 李善環), Princess Jeongsin (1526 – 1552) (정신옹주)
 Great-Great-Great-Great-Grandson - Han Jin (한진, 韓璡) (1541- ?)
 Great-Great-Great-Great-Granddaughter - Han Yeong-suk (한영숙, 韓英淑) (1545 - ?)
 Great-Great-Great-Great-Granddaughter - Han Gyeon-suk (한견숙, 韓堅淑) (1547 - ?)
 Great-Great-Great-Great-Granddaughter - Han Jong-suk (한종숙, 韓終淑) (1552 - ?)
 Great-Great-Grandson - Han Hye (한혜, 韓蕙)
 Great-Great-Great-Grandson - Han Gyeong-ji (한경지, 韓景祉)
 Great-Great-Grandson - Han On (한온, 韓蘊)
 Great-Great-Great-Grandson - Han Gyeong-yu (한경유)

Popular culture 
 Portrayed by Jang Yong in the 2011-2012 JTBC TV series Insu, The Queen Mother.

See also 
 Sejo of Joseon
 Sejong the Great
 Crown Prince Uikyung

References

External links 
 Han Hwak  
 Han Hwak 

1400 births
1456 deaths
Korean Confucianism
15th-century Korean people
Korean Confucianists
Korean revolutionaries
Cheongju Han clan